The Battle of Two Sisters was an engagement of the Falklands War during the British advance towards the capital, Port Stanley.  It took place from 11 to 12 June 1982 and was one of three battles in a Brigade-size operation all on the same night, the other two being the  Battle of Mount Longdon and the Battle of Mount Harriet. It was fought mainly between an assaulting British force consisting of Royal Marines of 45 Commando and an Argentine Company drawn from 4th Infantry Regiment (Regimiento de Infantería 4 or RI 4).

One of a number of night battles that took place during the British advance towards Stanley, the battle led to British troops capturing all the heights above the town, allowing its capture and the surrender of the Argentine forces on the islands.

Prelude

Composition of forces
The British force, commanded by Lieutenant-Colonel Andrew Whitehead, consisted of the Royal Marines of 45 Commando, the anti-tank troop from 40 Commando with support from six 105-mm guns of 29 Commando Regiment. The 2nd Battalion, Parachute Regiment (2 Para), was held in reserve. Naval gunfire support was provided by HMS Glamorgan's twin 4.5-inch (114 mm) guns.

45 Commando was instructed to seize Two Sisters Mountain under the cover of darkness and proceed onto Tumbledown Mountain if time allowed, but Argentine resistance was stiff enough to cancel the second phase of the attack.

The Argentinian force originally occupying Mount Challenger, commanded by Major Ricardo Cordón, consisted of the 4th Infantry Regiment (Regimiento de Infantería 4 or RI 4), with the bulk of the defenders drawn from C Company with the 1st Platoon (Sub-Lieutenant Miguel Mosquera-Gutierrez) and 2nd Platoon (Sub-Lieutenant Jorge Pérez-Grandi) on the northern peak of Two Sisters and the 3rd Platoon (Sub-Lieutenant Marcelo Llambias Pravaz) on the southern peak and the 1st Platoon A Company (Sub-Lieutenant Juan Nazer) and Support Platoon (Second Lieutenant Luis Carlos Martella) on the saddle between the two. Major Óscar Jaimet's B Company of the 6th Mechanized Infantry Regiment (Regimiento de Infantería Mecanizado 6 RI Mec 6), acting as the local reserve, occupied the saddle between Two Sisters and Mount Longdon. In early June, Jaimet's company would be reinforced with the Support Platoon under Second Lieutenant Marcelo Dorigón from the 12th Regiment's B Company who had been left behind on Mount Kent, after RI 12's B Company had been helicoptered forward as reinforcements during the Battle of Goose Green.

No-Man's-Land

From 1 June, the 4th Infantry Regiment, on Two Sisters and Mount Harriet, was given permission by Lieutenant-Colonel Diego Soria, to use their cold-weather ration packs, which lifted spirits and helped keep hunger under control among the conscripts.

On 2 June, the 4th Regiment's Operation Officer, Captain Carlos Alfredo López-Patterson, arrived to help in the defence of Two Sisters. He would visit the rifle platoons in order to maintain the defenders informed and raise morale:

On 4 June, the three rifle companies of 45 CDO advanced on Bluff Cove Peak, on the lower slopes of Mount Kent, and were able to occupy the feature without opposition and were met by patrols from the Special Air Service (SAS). On the night of 29 May, a fierce firefight had developed over capturing the two important hills, as they were intended to form part of an Argentine Special Forces line.

Captain Andrés Ferrero's patrol (3rd Assault Section, 602 Commando Company) reached the base of Mount Kent but were then promptly pinned down by machinegun and mortar fire. First-Sergeant Raimundo Máximo Viltes was badly wounded when a bullet shattered his heel. Air Troop had two SAS men wounded by rifle fire. Probing attacks around the D Squadron, SAS positions continued throughout the night and at 11:00 am local time on 30 May, about 12 Argentine Commandos (Captain Tomás Fernández's 2nd Assault Section, 602 Commando Company) tried to get up the summit of Bluff Cove Peak, but were driven off by D Squadron who killed two of the attackers, First Lieutenant Rubén Eduardo Márquez and Sergeant Óscar Humberto Blas.

First Lieutenant Márquez and Sergeant Blas had shown great personal courage and leadership in the contact and were posthumously awarded the Argentine Medal of Valour in Combat. During this contact, the SAS suffered another two casualties from grenades after the Argentine Commandos had stumbled on a camp occupied by 15 SAS troopers.

Throughout 30 May, Royal Air Force Harriers were active over Mount Kent. One of them, responding to a call for help from D Squadron SAS, was badly damaged by small arms fire while attacking Mount Kent's eastern lower slopes. Sub-Lieutenant Llambías-Pravaz's platoon was later credited with the destruction of Harrier XZ963 flown by Squadron Leader Jerry Pookwhile others claim the British fighter-bomber ran into fire from a battery of 35 mm Oerlikons under the command of 2nd Lieutenant Roberto Enrique Ferreof the 601st Anti-Aircraft Artillery Group. The Harrier crashed into the sea 30 miles from the carrier HMS Hermes, Squadron Leader Pook ejected and was rescued.

On 5 June, two Royal Air Force Harriers operating from 'Sids Strip', the San Carlos Forward Operating Base, attacked the Argentine defenders on Two Sisters with rockets around midday.

A heavy mist hung over the Murrell River area, which assisted the 45 Commando Recce Troop to reach and sometimes penetrate the Argentine 3rd Platoon position under Sub-Lieutenant Marcelo Llambías-Pravaz. Marine Andrew Tubb of Recce Troop was on these patrols:

For his patrol action, Lieutenant Chris Fox received the Military Cross, while Subteniente Llambías-Pravaz was able to pilfer and sport a Commando Beret that the Royal Marines had left behind during the Argentine counter ambush.
In general terms, the Argentines were thoroughly entrenched, about 6,000 metres or less across no-man's-land. The Argentine positions were mined and heavily patrolled.

The 4th Regiment also carried out patrolling, and on the night of 6–7 June, Corporal Oscar Nicolás Albornoz-Guevara along with eight conscripts (including Private Orlando Héctor Stella, his pathfinder) from Subteniente Miguel Mosquera-Gutierrez's 1st Platoon crossed Murrell River and reached the area of Estancia Mountain where they detected a number of British vehicles, but the patrol soon came under mortar fire from 3 PARA and had to withdraw.

On 8 June, Corporal Hugo Gabino MacDougall from the 6th Regiment's B Company claimed to have shot down a Harrier, with a shoulder-launched Blowpipe missile. The British admit the loss of a GR-3 Harrier (XZ-989) on this day when it made an emergency landing at San Carlos due to battle damage. The pilot (Wing Commander Peter Squire) was able to safely eject, but the Harrier was damaged beyond repair.

The 12th Regiment Support Platoon under Subteniente Dorigón attached to Major Jaimet's B Company would reportedly live off the land. Private Ángel Ramírez: 

 
At about 2.10 am local time on 10 June a strong 45 Commando fighting patrol probed the 3rd Platoon position. In the ensuing fight, Special Forces Sergeants Mario Antonio Cisneros and Ramón Gumercindo Acosta were killed; two more Argentine Special Forces lying in ambush for the Royal Marines were wounded. The British military historian Bruce Quarrie later wrote:

Major Aldo Rico, commander of the 602 Commando Company, had a lucky escape in this engagement, when an enemy 66mm projectile exploded uncomfortably close to him and First Lieutenant Horacio Fernando Lauría. Captain Hugo Ranieri, who took part in this intense engagement as a specialist sniper, claims that First Lieutenant Jorge Vizoso-Posse, although wounded, shot three of the retreating Royal Marines in the back. First Lieutenant Horacio Fernando Lauría and Sergeant Orlando Aguirre claim to have destroyed a British machine-gun with rifle-grenades in this engagement.

On that same night (9–10 June), a friendly fire incident occurred when a mortar section returning from a reconnaissance patrol were mistaken for Argentines in the dark and a British rifle platoon opened fire on them.In the confusion, four Royal Marines (Sergeant Robert Leeming, Corporals Andrew Uren, Peter Fitton and Marine Keith Phillips) were killed and three were wounded. 
The next day, Sub-Lieutenant Llambías-Pravaz's men recovered the rucksacks and weapons the Royal Marines had left behind, and these were presented as war trophies to Argentine war correspondents in Port Stanley who filmed and photographed the British equipment.

The Mountain and Arctic Warfare Cadre also carried out patrolling against Two Sisters; Sergeant Joseph Wassell and Lieutenant Fraser Haddow played an important part in the capture of the mountain when they discovered with their binoculars from their observation post on Goat Ridge, the command-detonated barrels of mines the Argentinian Marine engineers (under the direction of Major Jaimet) had dug in and planned to use on the saddle and eastern half of the mountain.

On 11 June, several GR-3 Harriers took off from San Carlos airbase to drop cluster bombs on Mounts Longdon, Harriet and Two Sisters Mountain.

Night battle

Captain Ian Gardiner's X-Ray Company spearheaded the attack on Two Sisters, accompanied by the unit's Commando-trained chaplain, the Revd Wynne Jones RN. Lieutenant James Kelly's 1 Troop took the western third of the spineback on the southern peak of Two Sisters ('Long Toenail'), with no fighting taking place. However at 11:00 pm local time, Lieutenant David Stewart's 3 Troop ran up against a very determined defence on the spineback and were unable to get forward. Beaten from their attempt to dislodge the Argentine 3rd Platoon, Lieutenant Chris Caroe's 2 Troop threw themselves at the platoon, but the attack was dispersed with the help of artillery fire. For three or four hours X Ray Company were pinned down on the slopes of the mountain. Naval gunfire rippled back and forth across the mountain, but the Argentine 3rd Platoon of Llambías-Pravaz, shouting their Guarani Indian war cry, held the Royal Marines off and were not dislodged until about 2:30 am local time. Colonel Andrew Whitehead realized that a single company could not hope to secure Two Sisters without massive casualties, and brought up the unit's two other companies.

At about 12:30 am local time Yankee and Zulu Companies attacked the northern peak ('Summer Days') and after a very hard two-hour fight against two rifle platoons (under Subtenientes Mosquera-Gutierrez and Pérez-Grandi) and despite heavy machine-gun and mortar fire, succeeded in capturing 'Summer Days'. The Argentine mortar platoon commander, Lieutenant Martella, after having consumed all of his ammunition in an earlier attempt to stop the advance of 42 CDO on Mount Harriet was killed in this action. The British Marines also lost two platoon commanders wounded in the Argentine mortar bombardments with Marine Chris Cooke later recalling, "The three officers in my company pledged to have a drink together at the other end of the island, but only one made it, the other two left with shrapnel wounds." The Z Company platoon commander, Lieutenant Clive Dytor, won the Military Cross by rallying his 8 Troop and leading it forward at bayonet point to take 'Summer Days'. He later recalled "I began listening to our rate of fire and I realised we were going to run out of ammunition. Then I remembered a line in a book about the Black Watch in the Second World War. They were pinned down and the adjutant stood up and shouted, 'Is this the Black Watch? Charge!’ What I didn’t remember, until I read it again later, was that he was actually cut in half at that point by a German machine gun. The next thing I knew I was up and running on my own, shouting, 'Zulu, Zulu, Zulu’, which was our company battle cry and also the battle cry of my father’s old regiment, [the] South Wales Borderers."

Second Lieutenant Aldo Eugenio Franco and his RI 6 platoon, after having scrapped a planned counterattackin conjunction with Major David Carullo's Panhard armoured car squadron, because the Two Sisters defenders no longer held the peaks, covered the Argentine withdrawal and prevented Yankee Company from attacking C Company as it withdrew from Two Sisters. Augusto Esteban La Madrid, a second lieutenant in the local reserve tasked with assisting Major Cordon, told British historian Martin Middlebrook that, during the final clashes, "Subteniente Franco's platoon was left as a rearguard, but he made it back to Tumbledown OK". Private Oscar Ismael Poltronieri who held up Yankee Company with accurate shooting with his rifle and a machine-gun, was awarded the Argentine Nation to the Heroic Valour in Combat Cross (CHVC), the highest Argentine decoration for bravery. Sub-Lieutenant Nazer had been wounded covering the withdrawal and the remnants of his platoon having been placed under the command of Corporal Virgilio Rafael Barrientos, took up positions on Sapper Hill. Sub-Lieutenants Mosquera-Gutierrez and Pérez-Grandi had been wounded in the British bombardment, and the remnants of their platoons were put under the command of Captain Carlos López Patterson, the Operations Officer of the 4th Regiment, who took up blocking positions in the ground between Mount Tumbledown and Wireless Ridge alongside the dismounted 10th Armoured Cavalry Reconnaissance Squadron under Captain Rodrigo Alejandro Soloaga, engaging at times with heavy machine gun and mortar fire the forward 3 PARA elements on Mount Longdon throughout the daylight hours of 12 and 13 June.

After capturing Two Sisters, 45 COMMANDO came under retaliatory fire from the surrounding Argentine positions. Captain Gardiner's X-Ray Company reported another wounded Marine (Corporal Frank Melia) in the daylight hours of 12 June after attracting mortar rounds from Tumbledown Mountain.A number of marines in Gardiner's company, sheltering in the abandoned bunkers on Two Sisters from the Argentine field artillery, were also incapacitated in the daylight hours of 12 and 13 June after losing their hearing in the near-misses from exploding 105mm and 155mm shells.

On 13 June, Argentine A-4 Skyhawk fighter-bombers got through the British Combat Air Patrols and attacked vehicles and helicopters stationed around 3 Commando Brigade Headquarters on the lower western slopes of Two Sisters (near Murrell River), resulting in a helicopter crewman injured and considerable structural damage to three Gazelle helicopters.

On the morning of 14 June, as 45 Commando on the forward slopes of Two Sisters prepared to reinforce the Welsh Guards consolidating on Sapper Hill, a Snowcat tracked vehicle from 407 Transportation Troop that arrived in support ran into a minefield and its driver got out to warn others behind of the danger ahead, only to step on an anti-personnel mine requiring urgent medical evacuation in a helicopter.

Naval bombardment
Naval gunfire support was provided by HMS Glamorgan'''s twin 4.5-inch (114 mm) guns.  The naval gunfire officer accompanying the Royal Marines had been wounded early in the battle for Two Sisters, but Bombardier Edward Holt from 29 Commando Regiment Royal Artillery, took over and continued to give swift and accurate directions to the destroyer and was subsequently awarded the Military Medal.

On the night of the battle Glamorgan was asked to remain in action longer than planned, to help Yankee Company clear Subteniente Aldo Franco's rifle platoon on the eastern half of Two Sisters covering the Argentine withdrawal.  As the destroyer took a short cut closer to the shoreline a RASIT radar of the Argentinian Army tracked her movements.

Two MM38 Exocet missiles had been removed from the destroyer ARA Seguí and secured on launcher, dubbed 'ITB' (Instalación de Tiro Berreta)  "trashy firing platform". The missiles, launcher, transporter, and associated electronics trailer were flown by transport aircraft to the Falkland Islands on 31 May. 

At 0336 local time, the British skipper, Commander Ian Inskip, looking at the radar screen, realized that Glamorgan was under attack by an anti-ship missile, and ordered a highspeed turn just before the Exocet struck the port side adjacent to the hangar.  The missile skidded on the deck and detonated, making a  hole in the hangar deck and a  hole in the galley area below, where a fire started.

The blast travelled forwards and down, and the missile, penetrated the hangar door, causing the ship's Wessex helicopter (HAS.3 XM837) to explode and start a severe fire in the hangar. Fourteen crew members were killed and about twenty wounded.

 Aftermath 
The next morning Colonel Andrew Whitehead looked in wonderment at the strength of the positions the enemy had abandoned. "With fifty Royals," he said, "I could have died of old age holding this place." (Max Hastings, Going To The Wars, p. 363, Macmillan 2000) Although the British unit seemed at the time to have had an easy victory, those actually engaged with the enemy platoons would have been unlikely to agree. Thirty years later, Marine Keith Brown recalled the fighting for the northern peak and concluded

British-American historian Hugh Bicheno has been critical of the 6th Infantry Regiment's 'B' Company who, he claims, withdrew in a disorderly manner from front-line positions at the opening of the battle, although this seems to have little foundation. Brigadier-General Oscar Luis Jofre had certainly been planning to counterattack on Two Sisters but with the defenders no longer in possession of the twin peaks, he ordered the abandonment of the feature and later wrote All of a sudden, we suffer the first emotional impact. It was  04.45 when we received reports from Major Jaimet saying that the defenders on Two Sisters could no longer resist the enemy attack and would begin their withdrawal. Major Oscar Ramón Jaimet has gone on record, saying in the Argentinean newspaper La Gaceta that he had designated Sub-Lieutenant Franco to cover the Argentinean withdrawal and that Argentinean artillery fire was brought down in error amongst the company. Indeed, the company withdrew in good order, according to the Spanish-speaking warrant officer attached to 3 Commando Brigade Headquarters in the fighting. The Argentine Army Official Report on the war recommended Major Oscar Ramon Jaimet and CSM Jorge Edgardo Pitrella of the 6th Regiment's B Company for an MVC (Argentine Nation to the Valour in Combat Medal) for the conduct of their fighting withdrawal and subsequent behaviour on Tumbledown (this was later granted to Major Jaimet, Pitrella was awarded the Argentine Army to the Effort and Abnegation Medal).

Sergeant-Major George Meachin of Yankee Company later praised the fighting abilities and spirit of the Argentine defenders of the northern peak in the form of the men of Pérez-Grandi and Mosquera-Gutierrez:

Hugh Bicheno described the moonscape of devastation:

With the telephone lines to the command post in shreds, Llambías Pravaz led his men to join M Company, 5th Marine Infantry Battalion on Sapper Hill. He had nearly been killed in the fighting when a rock impacted his helmet after a Milan missile exploded close behind him.

The X-Ray Company Marines were in awe of the Argentines in the depleted 3rd Platoon who had put up such determined resistance, and their company commander, Captain Gardiner in the book Above All, Courage (Above All, Courage: The Falklands Front Line: First-Hand Accounts, Max Arthur, pp. 389–390, Sidwick & Jackson, 1985) later said:

A lone conscript rifleman on 'Long Toenail' held out long after resistance had ended on the mountain. There was a humorous moment when the Revd. Wynne Jones was challenged by the Marines and called out that he was 45 Commando's padre and had forgotten the password.

Some 30 years later, Marine Nick Hunt of X-Ray Company got in contact with Sub-Lieutenant Marcelo Llambías-Pravaz, and in a televised reunion on the southern peak of the mountain, he returned the pictures he had found of the army officer and his platoon of conscripts the morning after the Royal Marines had stormed the position.

 Casualties 
Seven Royal Marine Commandos and a sapper from 59 Independent Commando Squadron, Royal Engineers were killed taking Two Sisters."All three companies then fought brisk battles on their objectives, suffering eight killed and seventeen wounded in the process." Jigsaw Puzzles: Tactical Intelligence in the Falklands Campaign, Giles Orpen-Smellie, p. ?, Amberley Publishing Limited, 2022
Another 17 British marines in 45 Commando,"All three companies then fought brisk battles on their objectives, suffering eight killed and seventeen wounded in the process." Jigsaw Puzzles: Tactical Intelligence in the Falklands Campaign, Giles Orpen-Smellie, p. ?, Amberley Publishing Limited, 2022including platoon commanders (Lieutenants Fox, Dunning and Davies) were wounded.  20 Argentines were killed in the first eleven days of June and the night of the battle, another 50 were wounded and 54 taken prisoner.

HMS Glamorgan, which was providing Naval gunfire support (NGS) stayed in her position to support the Royal Marine Commandos from Yankee Company who were pinned down. Glamorgan'' stayed past the time she was meant to leave and was hit by a land-based Exocet missile, fourteen crew were killed and more wounded as a result of this attack.

Awards received 
For bravery shown in the attack on Two Sisters, men from 45 Commando were awarded one DSO, three Military Crosses, one Distinguished Conduct Medal and four Military Medals. A commando from 29 Commando received a Military Medal as did a man from the M&AW Cadre.

Notes

References

Further reading
 45 COMMANDO'S approach to and Battle for TWO SISTERS
 'Zulu!': The Battle for Two Sisters
 CAPTAIN IAN GARDINER recalls the fighting
 Argentine conscripts re-live Two Sisters battle
 Two Sisters Mountain: The Argentinian Story
 Lieutenant Clive Dytor remembers his role during the attack on Two Sisters. He was awarded the MC (accessed Sunday 25 March 2012)
 MOD news: Marines in emotional return to the Falklands

External links
 The Battle for Two Sisters

Battles of the Falklands War
Conflicts in 1982
History of the Royal Marines
June 1982 events in South America